Lamont Bagby (born December 21, 1976) is an American politician of the Democratic Party. On November 3, 2015, he was elected to the Virginia House of Delegates, representing the 74th district, which includes Charles City County, parts of Henrico County and the city of Richmond. Bagby serves as Chair of the bicameral Virginia Legislative Black Caucus. He is a former member of the Henrico County School Board. 

Bagby is the Democratic nominee in an upcoming special election to Virginia's 9th Senate district, which was vacated by Jennifer McClellan following her election to Congress.

Political career

Lamont Bagby was a member of the Henrico County School Board (2008–2015), serving as chair in 2011. Bagby was then elected to the Virginia House of Delegates in a special election on July 21, 2015, and took the oath of office July 23, replacing Joe Morrissey, who resigned in April. He defeated David Lambert, son of longtime Virginia State Senator Benjamin Lambert.  Bagby also defeated Lambert in the general election on November 3, 2015.

In 2014, Governor Terry McAuliffe appointed Bagby to the Norfolk State University Board of Visitors.

Other recognition

Bagby was named to the top 40 Extraordinary leaders under 40 list in Richmond alternative newspaper Style Weekly in 2009.

Currently, Bagby is the chairman of the Virginia Legislative Black Caucus, an organization dedicated to improving the economic, educational, political and social conditions of African Americans and other underrepresented groups in the Commonwealth of Virginia.

Personal life

Delegate Bagby is a graduate of Henrico High School. He earned a Bachelor of Science degree in Business Education from Norfolk State University as well as a master's degree in Education Leadership from Virginia Commonwealth University.

Delegate Bagby also serves as the Director of Operations at the Peter Paul Development Center.

Electoral history

References

External links
Campaign website

1976 births
20th-century African-American people
21st-century African-American politicians
21st-century American politicians
African-American state legislators in Virginia
Henrico High School alumni
Living people
Democratic Party members of the Virginia House of Delegates
Norfolk State University alumni
Politicians from Richmond, Virginia
Virginia Commonwealth University alumni